Victoria "Vicky" Rogers McEvoy is a former American tennis player. She reached the third round of Wimbledon and the U.S. Open in 1968 and was ranked third in the United States that year.

Following her tennis career, Rogers attended Harvard Medical School and as of 2015 was an Assistant Professor of Pediatrics there.

References

External links 
 
 

American female tennis players
Harvard Medical School alumni
Living people
Year of birth missing (living people)
Place of birth missing (living people)
21st-century American women